Iago is a fictional supporting character who appears in Walt Disney Pictures' 31st animated feature film Aladdin (1992), the direct-to-video sequels The Return of Jafar (1994), Aladdin and the King of Thieves (1996), and the television series. An anthropomorphic red-plumed talking red lory, he was voiced by American comedian Gilbert Gottfried in all animated appearances up to his death in 2022. He was also voiced by Alan Tudyk in the live action adaptation of Aladdin.

Iago appeared in the original film as a henchman to the first main villain of the franchise, Jafar, functioning both as comic relief and the secondary antagonist. He reformed for the better over the franchise's run in the sequels and television series, joining the protagonists as an antihero and being the main protagonist in The Return of Jafar. His name is a homage to the villain of William Shakespeare's Othello.

Development 
In the original story treatment by Howard Ashman, Iago (previously named Sinbad) had been originally conceived as a "British" calm and serious straight man working off Jafar, who was originally conceived as more over-the-top, comedic, and irritable, but the filmmakers later reversed their personalities in large part in order to make Jafar more threatening and when they saw Gilbert Gottfried in Beverly Hills Cop II, Gottfried was cast to provide Iago's voice.

Screenwriter Terry Rossio shared a concept behind Iago on his website Wordplay, in that Jafar transferred his emotions to his pet, allowing him to do magic without distractions. Rossio also mentioned, since Iago is too small to contain such emotions, "you end up with a feathered Gilbert Gottfried." Iago's animator Will Finn tried to incorporate some aspects of Gottfried's appearance into Iago's design, especially his semi-closed eyes and the always-appearing teeth.

Gilbert Gottfried has said that his voiceover career really began after voicing the character in the 1992 film.
“... that has been one of those things that lives on,” he said. “That seemed to open the door for other voiceover jobs.”

Gottfried's unique onstage persona led to him being cast as the wise-cracking Iago. Gottfried is often referred to as "the Iago guy" and similar terms, being more known by his voice role than by name.

Characteristics 
Iago resembles a red lory, with red feathers and blue tipped wings, bluish-purple tail, and white around the eyes. He can speak fluent English and has the ability to perfectly mimic other characters' voices. He also possesses knowledge of various tricks learned from Jafar. He is easily frustrated and openly vocalizes his frustrations, and avoids direct confrontations if he can help it, but when required, he can be quite cunning and mischievous.
 	
Iago is arrogant and also known for his notorious greed of treasure and gold, for which he will go to outlandish lengths to acquire, usually dragging along Abu to help him, but Abu's incompetence always costs him. Iago is often put in situations of deciding between saving his own tail feathers or doing the right thing. His guilt always leads him to do the latter as he lacks a moral conscience; his greed leaves him unsatisfied in usually losing some form of reward or riches, for which he always berates himself afterwards.
 	 
He (as well as maybe Jafar) is a reference to the character of the same name. In Shakespeare's play Othello, Iago is the name of the titular protagonist's ensign; though believed to be trustworthy, all he cares about is getting himself ahead and his own wants. The play revolves around his devious scheme to find a way to get what he wants—an unpleasant surprise to everyone when he is exposed.

Appearances 
According to a piece of conversation in The Return of Jafar, Jafar had picked up Iago in Agrabah's bazaar and reared him as his accomplice in crime. He also mentions in the animated series of having a criminal twin brother named Othello, reference to his name's supposed origins.

Aladdin 

In the first movie, he resents living under the Sultan and Jasmine as much as his owner Jafar does, though he contrasts Jafar's dark brooding with angry, sarcastic ranting. Iago often says how he hates crackers which the Sultan always force-feeds him. The Sultan seems to not know until the end of the first movie that Iago can fully comprehend and converse in human speech and is evil. In the end, Iago is dragged into Jafar's lamp with him at the end of the movie and is banished to the Cave of Wonders.

Several allusions to Shakespeare's Othello are seen:
 Jafar and Iago resent living under the Sultan and Jasmine like how Shakespeare's Iago and Roderigo resent Othello.
 Similarly, each individual hates their opposition for different reasons and in differing manners:
 Jafar and Shakespeare's Iago resent being second best, and in dark brooding orchestrate most of the betrayal.
 Jafar's Iago and Roderigo are more vocal, contrasting dark brooding with bouts of useless complaining (in the case of Roderigo) and angry sarcastic ranting (in the case of Iago). Iago often says how he hates crackers which the Sultan always force-feeds him; and Roderigo complains about being at the short end of the stick, what with lusting for Othello's wife Desdemona, whose father Brabantio promised him for a hand in marriage.
 Neither pairing's superiors seem to know of betrayal until it is too late. Whereas Shakespeare's Iago and Roderigo never gain their wants, however, Jafar and his Iago do, albeit for a short period of time.
 Both Jafar and Shakespeare's Iago end up imprisoned for their actions, and their respective accomplices pay dearly with it. But while Shakespeare's Iago kills Roderigo before being ousted, Jafar drags his Iago into the lamp with him.

The Return of Jafar 

A year after the events of the first film, Iago manages to escape from the lamp, but refuses to free Jafar, having grown tired of being ordered around, and instead throws him into a well. After returning to Agrabah, Iago is confronted by Aladdin but inadvertently ends up saving him from Abis Mal and his henchmen. In gratitude, Aladdin takes Iago back to the palace and convinces the Sultan to give him a second chance. Iago slowly begins warming up to Aladdin, but Jafar also returns to Agrabah, having been freed by Abis Mal, and coerces Iago into conspiring with him to frame Aladdin for the Sultan's murder and have him executed while Aladdin's friends are locked in the dungeon for life. Iago initially goes along with it, but turns against Jafar and again saves Aladdin by freeing the Genie, who saves Aladdin from being executed. In the final battle against Jafar, Iago is severely injured by one of Jafar's blasts, but manages to kick Jafar's lamp into the molten lava, destroying it and Jafar once and for all, while he is taken to safety by Aladdin. From the Sultan's wrath in return for Iago unintentionally saving him from Abis Mal, and finally risking his life to kill Jafar by pushing his lamp into molten lava. Following his heroic deed, he is accepted into the palace.

Aladdin TV series 

In the series, he provides a sarcastic, realistic, or cowardly perspective on events and is only really willing to face danger if the great reward is promised. However, he is sometimes forced to battle his conscience (despite respectively saying in The Return of Jafar that he never had one), and generally does the right thing even when he doesn't have to or could just as easily leave the city (alone) altogether: when Sadira used memory sand that somehow caused her and Jasmine to switch lives, with animals unaffected, Iago leads Abu and Rajah in finding Jasmine to restore the world to normal. Iago's common schemes involve trying to sell anything with any value (real or not), trying to steal things, and trying to treasure-hunt; he can usually convince Abu to be his partner in crime, but Abu is more likely to leave at the first sign of danger and often lacks the finesse that Iago requires. He cares a lot about Abu, though, as shown in episodes such as "Much Abu About Something".

Iago and Thundra the rain-bird had feelings for one another, despite a rocky start and him admitting his manipulative personality made appealing to others difficult; Aladdin has occasionally exploited the latter fact, since antagonists are more willing to accept Iago as being more ruthless and amoral than he actually is, though, given Iago's villainous origins and upbringings in the underworld, this is rational. Due to his time with Jafar, Iago possesses extensive knowledge of various forms of magic, not only proving useful as Genie's otherwise superior knowledge is ten thousand years out of date (it was Iago who recognized the Kingdom of the Black Sand and its former ruler the evil wizard Destane, who was even more worse than Jafar in "The Citadel"), but also giving him Genie's ability to commonly reference modern things for humor, albeit without a logical excuse (one episode has him screaming in his sleep, "YOU GOT THE WRONG GUY! YOU WANT MY TWIN BROTHER, OTHELLO!", a reference to the play where his name may have come from).

As a sidekick Iago is always good for a laugh—an in-joke in the episode "When Chaos Comes Calling" has Iago running in panic after his face is turned into that of his voice actor Gilbert Gottfried ("I WANT MY BEAK BACK!"). Iago's and Genie's interactions revolve around their magical talents: in one episode Genie gives Iago his powers just for one day (though this backfires when Iago actually tries to do just one good deed by bring water to the desert), and Iago is the only one who knows that Genie once used his own magic to make himself an ice cream sundae as big as a pyramid (something that Genie dares not let the Genie Guild know about).

He favors Jasmine the most of the group, not because she trusts him, but because she is the one whose trust he has to work for.

Aladdin and the King of Thieves 

He helps out with Aladdin and Jasmine's wedding, as well as aiding Aladdin to find his estranged father Cassim, who happens to be the King of the Forty Thieves. Acting on behalf for Aladdin, Iago convinces Cassim to attend the wedding, promising that he will help him get the Hand of Midas. In the end, although the Sultan pardoned him from the sentence of life imprisonment for his complicity with the King of Thieves, Iago chooses to depart Agrabah for some time with Cassim instead of staying with Aladdin and Jasmine on the grounds that he could not handle the "lovey-dovey" stuff, though he briefly breaks down in tears while telling Cassim, implying he will miss them dearly. He also points out that Cassim's sense of thievery is more in line with his as well. He is last seen with Cassim waving farewell to the newly-wed Aladdin and Jasmine as they ride off to the night.

Disney Princess Enchanted Tales: Follow Your Dreams 

Iago has returned to Agrabah as his travels with Cassim at the end.

Kingdom Hearts 

In the video game Kingdom Hearts, he is initially Jafar's sidekick, but then later is used by the player to assist in defeating Jafar. His Japanese voice actor in Kingdom Hearts is Akira Kamiya, and his voice actor in Kingdom Hearts II is Tōru Ōkawa. Gilbert Gottfried reprises his role in the English versions of both games.

In Kingdom Hearts: Chain of Memories he makes a brief cameo appearance during the Boss battle against Jafar's genie form. During the battle, attacking Jafar has no effect. Rather, the lamp must be hit which is held up high by Iago, à la The Return Of Jafar. It can therefore be assumed that Iago is on the side of the good guys again.

In Kingdom Hearts II, like in The Return of Jafar, Iago leaves Jafar and returns to Agrabah in a slump after failing to make amends to Aladdin and Jasmine. When he unintentionally assisted Sora in the task of beating the Heartless and retrieving Jafar's lamp, he manages to gain everyone's trust. But that trust is soon shattered when Iago is forced to help Jafar yet again in keeping Sora and the others occupied at the ruins. Despite losing faith, Iago redeems himself by intentionally getting shot by a spell that Jafar intended to shoot at Aladdin. After Jafar's defeat, Iago reveals he wants to help Aladdin out, but can't do as much as Genie and the others. However, Sora tells Iago that friendship is about enjoying each other's company and having fun.

A data based version of Iago appears in Kingdom Hearts Coded playing a small role first helping Jafar steal Genie's lamp and later appearing during the battle against Jafar, playing a similar role from past games of focusing on Iago to get the lamp back. The later HD cinematic version of Kingdom Hearts Re:Coded that was created for Kingdom Hearts HD 2.5 ReMIX included some new dialogue for Iago.

Aladdin (2019) 

Iago appears in the 2019 live-action Aladdin, voiced by Alan Tudyk. It marks the first time Iago is not voiced by Gilbert Gottfried, who confirmed that he was not asked to reprise the role. While his role remains the same and he still shows signs of sentience and a cynical sense of humor, he is notably less anthropomorphic than his animated counterpart as the film wanted to make Iago more realistic. This still manages to leave only a few plot-related deviations:

 He first appears during the song "Arabian Nights", where Rajah slashes at him with his claws for spying on Jasmine. He instead flies to the Cave of Wonders to be with Jafar, while laughing maliciously.
 He later appears in Jafar's lair in the castle dungeon. After Jafar talks to the Sultan, Iago mimics Jafar saying "remember your place", after which Jafar threatens the bird if he says it again; this is ironic, however, as Jafar hates being called second and is only mildly annoyed with Iago saying it. Iago then spots Aladdin sneaking into the palace, alerting his master with the words "Thief! Thief in the palace!".
 He has a rivalry with Abu, calling him a “dirty monkey” twice, and asking a captured Aladdin about the capuchin’s whereabouts.
 He's later enlarged and piloted by Jafar in order to retrieve the lamp from Aladdin, Jasmine, and Abu; he succeeds only for a mere moment before being transformed back to a normal parrot, though he succeeds again with Jafar's help.

Other appearances 
With his travels with Cassim at the end, Iago has returned to Agrabah and appears as a supporting character in the straight-to-DVD movie Disney Princess Enchanted Tales: Follow Your Dreams, and he performs a musical number called "Peacock Princess" with Princess Jasmine in her princess duties.

Like most characters from Disney's animated films, Iago made recurring appearances on Disney's House of Mouse, he also sings "A Parrot's Life For Me" at the House of Mouse where the movies' continuity did not seem to matter, and Iago was depicted as either Jafar's sidekick or exhibiting his protagonist behavior.

At Walt Disney World, along with Zazu from The Lion King, he was introduced as one of the hosts of The Enchanted Tiki Room (Under New Management) in 1998. Following a small fire in 2011, the two were removed as the attraction reverted to its earlier format as Walt Disney's Enchanted Tiki Room. Reports had described the 1998 format as "unpopular" and Iago as "annoying."

Iago also appears in the stage adaptation of the film. However, unlike his film counterpart, he is portrayed as a human, working as a personal assistant to Jafar.

Iago appears in season six of Once Upon a Time: however, this version is a non-anthropomorphic red cockatiel as opposed to a lory.

Reception 
In reviews for The Return of Jafar, Iago was often described as being the real star of the film: "The plot thickens when Aladdin becomes indebted to Jafar's former partner, Iago (a wisecracking parrot), for saving his life. Struggling with issues of honesty and loyalty, Iago becomes the film's focus as he grapples between standing by Aladdin or succumbing to Jafar's evil pressures."

In popular culture 
Iago's ability of mimicking voices (e.g., Aladdin) was referenced during a sketch entitled the "Real Housewives of Disney" in an episode of Saturday Night Live.

References 

Aladdin (franchise) characters
Disney animated villains
Animated characters in film
Film characters introduced in 1992
Animated characters introduced in 1992
Fictional con artists
Fictional henchmen
Fictional parrots
Fictional defectors
Film sidekicks
Male characters in animated films
Male characters in animation
Male film villains
Talking animals in fiction